Craugastor xucanebi is a species of frog in the family Craugastoridae. It is endemic to Guatemala.

Habitat
The species is known from the central highlands of Guatemala, including Sierra de los Cuchumatanes, Sierra de Xucaneb, and Sierra de las Minas. It typically occurs in bushes and undergrowth, and might also be found in slightly degraded forest.

Threats
It is threatened by habitat loss caused by agricultural encroachment, extraction of wood, and human settlement.

References

External links

xucanebi
Endemic fauna of Guatemala
Amphibians of Guatemala
Amphibians described in 1941
Taxonomy articles created by Polbot